Jaiz Bank Plc, is a bank in Nigeria operating under Islamic banking principles and is a non-interest bank. It is the first non-interest bank established in Nigeria and is headquartered in Abuja, the capital city of the country.

, the bank was a medium-sized, financial services provider in Nigeria. At that time, the bank's total assets were valued at US$88.8 million (NGN:14.1 billion), with shareholders' equity of about US$63.6 million (NGN:10.1 billion). The Bank operates 27 branches and provides regular ATM service as well as online, mobile, and SMS banking services.

History
The institution was founded in 2003, as Jaiz International Plc. On 11 November 2011, Jaiz International received a license from the Central Bank of Nigeria, the national banking regulator, to operate as a regional bank. On 6 January 2012, the institution commenced business as Jaiz Bank Plc in offices and branches in Abuja, Kaduna and Kano.

In 2013, Jaiz Bank was in the process of expanding to urban centers in all states of the Federal Republic of Nigeria. In pursuit of that goal, the bank had received approval to increase shareholders' capital from the then current value, to US$92.3 million (NGN:14.3 billion). In January 2013, print media reports indicated that, at that time, shareholder's equity in the bank exceeded US$71 million (NGN:11 billion). The bank applied for a national banking license, once it met its shareholders' capital objectives and was issued the license in 2016

Ownership
The stock shares of Jaiz Bank, Plc, are privately held. Although the detailed shareholding remains largely unknown, the five major shareholder groups are depicted in the table below:

See also
 List of banks in Nigeria
 Islamic banking
 Interest-free economy
 Economy of Nigeria

References

Banks of Nigeria
Banks established in 2003
Abuja